The Egyptian national beach handball team is the national team of Egypt. It is governed by the Egyptian Handball Federation and takes part in international beach handball competitions.

Results

World Championships

World Games

References

External links
Official website
IHF profile

Beach handball
National team
National beach handball teams